The Beast (also known as The Beast of War) is a 1988 American war film directed by Kevin Reynolds and written by William Mastrosimone, based on his play Nanawatai. The film follows the crew of a Soviet T-55 tank who became lost during the Soviet war in Afghanistan. The film has enjoyed a cult-favorite status in spite of its low box office statistics.

Plot
In 1981 Afghanistan, a Soviet T-55 tank unit attacks a Pashtun village harboring a group of mujahideen fighters. Following the assault, one of the tanks—commanded by ruthless commander Daskal—takes a wrong turn through a mountain pass and enters a blind valley. Taj returns to discover the village destroyed, and his father and brother killed—the latter by having been crushed under Daskal's tank. As the new khan following his brother's death, Taj is spurred to seek revenge and leads a band of mujahideen fighters into the valley to pursue Daskal's tank, which they call "The Beast," counting on their captured RPG-7 anti-tank weapon to destroy it.

Lost, isolated, and with their radio damaged in the village attack, the tank crew set out to find Kandahar Road and return to Soviet lines. While camping for the night, Afghan communist crewman Samad educates the reluctant tank driver, Konstantin Koverchenko, about the Pashtun people's code of honour, Pashtunwali; particularly nanawatai, which requires that an enemy is to be given sanctuary if requested.

En route, the crew suffer several setbacks and ambushes from Taj's band. Suspecting Samad to be a traitor, Daskal murders him in front of his men; Koverchenko threatens to report Daskal. At a brief stop, Koverchenko states that the tank is breaking down; Daskal accuses him of mutiny and orders gunner Kaminski and loader Golikov to tie him to a rock, and leave him with a grenade behind his head as a booby-trap for the mujahideen. Wild dogs eventually attack Koverchenko, but he is saved when the grenade rolls off the rock and explodes, scaring them away. Taj's band reunite with several vengeful women from the village and find Koverchenko, who pleads for nanawatai. The mujahideen give him food and shelter. Koverchenko befriends Taj after fixing the broken RPG-7 and agrees to help them destroy the tank.

Meanwhile, the remaining tank crew finally realize they are trapped in the valley, until a Soviet helicopter appears and offers to rescue them. Daskal refuses the offer, has the tank refueled, and the crew heads back towards the narrow mountain pass where they entered, which the helicopter pilot says is the only way out. The crew drives through the night and find the helicopter crew dead—they drank from a waterhole unaware that the tank crew had poisoned earlier with cyanide.

The mujahideen and Koverchenko catch up with the tank and pursue it through the pass. Koverchenko finally fires the RPG after a tense chase, only to damage the tank's main gun. Just as it seems the tank will escape, the village women use explosives to blow up the cliff-side, dropping boulders onto the tank and disabling it. Koverchenko sets fire to the tank's leaked fuel, forcing the crew to bail; he pleads nanawatai on their behalf, and Taj reluctantly agrees. Koverchenko confronts Daskal over his brutality, and declares he hopes that he lives to see the Soviets lose the war.

Kaminski and Golikov flee on foot, but Daskal is chased down by the village women and murdered; they bring back his bloodied uniform to Taj as a trophy. Horrified, Koverchenko waves down an arriving Soviet helicopter to be rescued. Koverchenko salutes Taj as he is hoisted by a harness, brandishing a jezail musket Taj had gifted to him. The film ends with Koverchenko flying off with the helicopter over the Afghan landscape.

Cast

 George Dzundza as Commander 'Tank Boy' Daskal
 Jason Patric as Konstantin Koverchenko
 Steven Bauer as Khan Taj 
 Erick Avari as Samad 
 Stephen Baldwin as Anatoli Golikov 
 Donald Patrick Harvey as Kaminski
 David Sherrill as Kovolov
 Kabir Bedi as Akbar
 Chaim Jeraffi as Moustafa
 Shoshi Marciano as Sherina
 Yitzhak Ne'eman as Iskandar
 Roberto Pollack as Shahzaman
 Avi Gilor as Khahzaman
 Beni Baruchin as Afzal
 Victor Ken as Ali
 Avi Keedar as Noor
 Claude Aviram as Sadioue
 Moshe Vapnik as Hasan
 Dale Dye as Helicopter Crew Chief (uncredited)

Production

Filming
The film was shot in Israel.  Several actual T-55 tanks were used in the film; however, the helicopter used in the film was not a real Mi-8, but an Aerospatiale SA.321 Super Frelon. The tank in question in the movie is actually an Israeli modification of a Soviet T-55 captured by the Israelis from their Arab armies, redesignated as the Ti-67 and fitted with a 105mm main gun in place of the original 100mm gun, leading some to mistake it for a T-62. The Ti-67 tank in particular is more distinctly known as the Tiran 4Sh. Many of these conversions were used by the Israelis during the 1973 Yom Kippur War. The film's military advisor, Dale Dye, has written that he negotiated the purchase of the tanks over drinks with Israel Defense Forces officers in a Tel Aviv hotel. The language spoken by the Afghan characters is Pashto. The Pashto dialogue is subtitled but some television screenings have omitted the subtitles.

Music

Soundtrack
The original soundtrack music was released by CBS/Columbia Records shortly after the movie's debut, written and performed entirely by Mark Isham. The back of the album suggests two tracks ("Badal" and "Nanawatai"), but there are, in fact, ten. Offered in 12-inch LP vinyl, CrO2 cassette and DDD-format compact discs. Used CD copies command rather high prices since limited numbers were released in spite of composer Mark Isham's celebrity status.

In addition to the soundtrack, the song Троллейбус ("Trolleybus") by the Russian rock band Kino is heard playing on the radio during a scene. However, Троллейбус was not released until 1983, two years after the events portrayed in the movie. The song was titled Streetcar Headed East in English-speaking countries.

See also
List of American films of 1988
List of Asian historical drama films
Afghan Breakdown

References

External links

Notes on the production from military advisor Dale Dye  broken link

1988 films
1980s war films
American war adventure films
American war drama films
War epic films
1980s English-language films
Pashto-language films
Cold War films
American films based on plays
Films about armoured warfare
Soviet–Afghan War films
Fiction about tanks
Films directed by Kevin Reynolds
Films set in Afghanistan
Films shot in Afghanistan
Films shot in Israel
Films scored by Mark Isham
American anti-communist propaganda films
1980s American films